The large moth subfamily Lymantriinae contains the following genera beginning with C:

References 

Lymantriinae
Lymantriid genera C